Johann Peter Joseph Weyer (19 May 1794, Cologne - 25 August 1864, Cologne) was a German architect, most notable as city architect to the city of Cologne.

External links
Johann-Peter Weyer: Lithografien und Aquarelle, 1838

Architects from Cologne
19th-century German architects
1794 births
1864 deaths